Nuts is a 1987 American drama film directed by Martin Ritt, starring Barbra Streisand and Richard Dreyfuss. The screenplay by Tom Topor, Darryl Ponicsan and Alvin Sargent is based on Topor's 1979 play of the same title. It was both Karl Malden and Robert Webber's final feature film, and also included Leslie Nielsen's last non-comedic role.

Plot
When call girl Claudia Draper kills client Allen Green in self-defense, her mother Rose and stepfather Arthur Kirk attempt to have her declared mentally incompetent by Herbert Morrison in order to avoid a public scandal. Claudia knows that, if her parents succeed, she will be remanded to a mental institution indefinitely, so she is determined to prove she is sane enough to stand trial.

The attorney her parents hire to defend her quits after Claudia assaults him in the courtroom. The judge appoints public defender Aaron Levinsky to handle her case, as he happens to be in the courtroom. Although he is overbooked, he refuses to engage with the other lawyers without speaking to the defendant personally. Claudia resists him and is openly hostile until she finally accepts that he is on her side. 

Levinsky begins to probe her background to determine how the child of supposedly model upper middle class parents could find herself in this situation, and with each piece of her past he uncovers, he receives additional, disturbing insight into what brought Claudia to this crossroads in her life. 

In the psych ward where she is being held, she has a nightmare reliving what happened the day she killed the man in self-defense. He tried to force her to get into the bath.

When her mother gets up on the stand, which Claudia was opposed to, Claudia has a flashback. In it she is very upset crying in her bedroom and her mother closes the door on her, ignoring her. 

When her stepfather is on the stand, during the cross-examination, it is revealed that Arthur molested Claudia as a child until she was 16. Claudia has a flashback with someone trying to force himself into the bathroom. The mother gets visibly upset with this line of questioning, and Claudia also acts traumatized.

Finally, Claudia takes the stand in her own defense, and asserts that she is not insane simply because she doesn't fit society's image of what a woman should be. 

In the end, the judge decides she is competent to stand trial, and she leaves the courtroom on her own recognizance while she awaits her trial.

The movie ends with information stating Claudia stood trial for first-degree manslaughter, with Levinsky as her attorney, and she was acquitted.

Cast
 Barbra Streisand as Claudia Draper
 Richard Dreyfuss as Aaron Levinsky
 Maureen Stapleton as Rose Kirk
 Karl Malden as Arthur Kirk
 Eli Wallach as Herbert Morrison
 Robert Webber as Francis MacMillan
 James Whitmore as Judge Stanley Murdoch
 Leslie Nielsen as Allen Green
 William Prince as Clarence Middleton
 Dakin Matthews as Judge Lawrence Box

Production
In 1980, Universal Studios purchased the film rights to Tom Topor's off-off-Broadway play and financed its move to Broadway. The studio greenlighted the film adaptation in January 1982 and announced Mark Rydell would produce and direct Debra Winger in the relatively low-budget film. Barbra Streisand had campaigned for the role, but filming was scheduled to begin in the summer of 1982 and Rydell was unwilling to postpone the project while she completed Yentl.

Universal was concerned about the controversial nature of Nuts and eventually sold it to Warner Bros., where it remained in limbo until 1986, when Streisand was signed for $5 million plus a percentage of the gross. Topor and Rydell clashed about the film's focus and Rydell eventually quit, citing scheduling problems, budgetary concerns, and artistic differences. It was his second time that he had abandoned a Streisand property; he had walked away from A Star Is Born a decade earlier. Streisand assumed producing duties but declined to direct, and Martin Ritt was hired to replace Rydell. Streisand hired Andrzej Bartkowiak, who had filmed the documentary chronicling the making of The Broadway Album, as director of photography. She researched her role by studying schizophrenic patients in a mental ward and interviewing prostitutes at a Los Angeles brothel, and began to work on her own draft of the screenplay. Although she received no screen credit for her work, the studio later publicly acknowledged her contribution.

Richard Dreyfuss was offered the role of Aaron Levinsky, but he passed. Dustin Hoffman suggested himself, but Warner refused to meet his artistic and salary demands. At various times the media reported Marlon Brando, Paul Newman, and Al Pacino were considered. Original choice Dreyfuss finally was cast, and filming was postponed yet again to allow him to complete Tin Men.

This film also has the distinction of being Leslie Nielsen's final dramatic film role. Nielsen had been establishing himself in comedy and the next year would star in The Naked Gun.

Aside from a few days of exterior shooting in Manhattan, the film, budgeted at $25 million, was made in Los Angeles. Principal photography began on October 6, 1986 and ended in early February. When the film previewed in October 1987, audience feedback was very positive, leading Streisand to believe it was powerful enough to sell itself. She refused to promote it other than in a three-part interview with Gene Shalit on The Today Show, although she later participated in a press conference when the film was released in foreign markets.

Critical reception
On Rotten Tomatoes the film has an approval rating of 41% rating based on reviews from 27 critics.

Janet Maslin of The New York Times observed, "The film is almost entirely adrift. A group of three screenwriters ... have not succeeded in giving it any momentum at all ... The material is exceptionally talky and becalmed, the central question none too compelling, and the visual style distractingly cluttered … Still, Miss Streisand ... manages to be every inch the star."

Roger Ebert of the Chicago Sun-Times rated the film two out of four stars and noted that "the movie's revelations are told in such dreary, clichéd, weather-beaten old movie terms that we hardly care … As the courtroom drama slogs its weary way home, Streisand's authentic performance as a madwoman seems harder and harder to sustain ... Nuts is essentially just a futile exercise in courtroom cliches, surrounding a good performance that doesn't fit."

Rita Kempley of The Washington Post called the film "a consistent character study, paced like a good thriller" and cited Barbra Streisand's "bravissimo performance". She added, "She is so dazzling, in fact, that she blinds us to the pat psychology of the facile script ... There's heat in the moment, but there's nothing to chew on afterward ... Nuts is less than the sum of its illustrious parts. Despite all its achievements, it's ultimately hollow inside, like a cake at a bachelor party. The filmmakers never quite succeed in their larger purpose: pitting inner truths against outward appearances to force us to decide who is and is not nuts. It wants to be a movie with a message, but in the end it's just a melodrama." Desson Howe of The Washington Post said of the film, "[I]t's Hollywood manipulation at its best. You're given little emotional tidbits along the way until the high point."

Jonathan Rosenbaum of the Chicago Reader commented, "While the movie holds one's attention throughout, and its liberal message is compelling, we are clued in to certain facts about the heroine so early on that the audience is never really tested along with the characters. What might have been a sharper existential confrontation of our received ideas about sanity merely comes across as an effective courtroom drama, with strategically placed revelations and climaxes."

Accolades
The film was nominated for the Golden Globe Award for Best Motion Picture – Drama. Streisand was nominated for the Golden Globe Award for Best Actress – Motion Picture Drama, and for the David di Donatello for Best Foreign Actress. Dreyfuss was nominated for the Golden Globe Award for Best Supporting Actor – Motion Picture.

Home media
Warner Home Video released the film on Region 1 DVD on July 1, 2003. It is in anamorphic widescreen format with audio tracks in English and French and subtitles in English, French, and Spanish. Bonus features include commentary by Barbra Streisand and a production stills gallery.

References

External links
 
 
 Nuts at the Barbra Streisand archives

1987 films
1987 drama films
American legal drama films
American films based on plays
American courtroom films
Films set in New York City
Films directed by Martin Ritt
Warner Bros. films
Barwood Films films
Films produced by Barbra Streisand
Films with screenplays by Alvin Sargent
1980s English-language films
1980s American films